Alain Bergala (born 8 August 1943), is a French film critic, essayist, screenwriter and director.

Biography 
Former writer for Cahiers du cinéma, he is best known as a specialist in the works of Jean-Luc Godard.

He taught at the University of Paris III: Sorbonne Nouvelle and at La Fémis. In 2000, he became the cinema counsellor of Jack Lang with whom he worked regarding the arts in education.

He directed his first feature film in 1982.

Filmography 
 1983: Faux fuyants (co-director : Jean-Pierre Limosin)
 1987: Où que tu sois
 1995: Cesare Pavese (part of the series- Un siècle d'écrivains)
 1997: Fernand Léger, les motifs d'une vie
 1998: D'Angèle à Toni

Publications 
 Books by Alain Bergala on Google Books
 Alain Bergala, The Cinema Hypothesis. Teaching Cinema in the Classroom and Beyond, FilmmuseumSynemaPublikationen Vol. 28, Vienna 2016,

Notes and references 

1943 births
Living people
French film critics
French film directors
People from Var (department)
French male non-fiction writers
Sorbonne Nouvelle University Paris 3 alumni
Academic staff of Sorbonne Nouvelle University Paris 3